Thanga Darlong (born 20 July 1920) is an Indian folk music artist, known for his contribution to the folk music of Tripura and his work in preserving & promoting the traditional instrument Rosem. 
  
He was awarded the Padma Shri (2019), the fourth highest civilian award in India. He is also a recipient of Sangeet Natak Akademi Award 2014), the highest Indian recognition given to practising artists. He is also a recipient of Academic Fellowship Award (2015), state-level Vayoshresta Samman (2016) and Centenarian Award.

Darlong hails from a Small Hilly ADC Village DeoraCherra Muraibari under Gournagar RD Block of Kailashahar in Unakoti district, Tripura. In 2016, he was also showcased in Tree of Tongues in Tripura directed by Josy Joseph.

Honours 
 Padma Shri (2019)
 Sangeet Natak Akademi Award (2014)

See also 

 List of Padma Shri award recipients (2010–2019)

References

External links 
 

Living people
Indian centenarians
Indian folk musicians
Recipients of the Padma Shri in arts
Recipients of the Sangeet Natak Akademi Award
People from Tripura
People from Unakoti district
1920 births

Kokborok playback singers